Characidae, the characids or characins is a family of freshwater subtropical and tropical fish, belonging to the order Characiformes. The name "characins" is the historical one, but scientists today tend to prefer "characids" to reflect their status as a by and large monophyletic group at family rank. To arrive there, this family has undergone much systematic and taxonomic change. Among those fishes that remain in the Characidae for the time being are the tetras, comprising the very similar genera Hemigrammus and Hyphessobrycon, as well as a few related forms such as the cave and neon tetras. Fish of this family are important as food and also include popular aquarium fish species.

One of the smallest species, Hyphessobrycon roseus, grows to a maximum length of 1.9 cm.

These fish inhabit a wide range and a variety of habitats. They originate in the Americas, ranging from southwestern Texas and Mexico through Central and South America. Many of these fish come from rivers, but, for example, the blind cave tetra even inhabits caves.

Systematics
This family has undergone a large amount of systematic and taxonomic change. More recent revision has moved many former members of the family into their own related but distinct families – the pencilfishes of the genus Nannostomus are a typical example, having now been moved into the Lebiasinidae, the assorted predatory species belonging to Hoplias and Hoplerythrinus have now been moved into the Erythrinidae, and the sabre-toothed fishes of the genus Hydrolycus have been moved into the Cynodontidae. The former subfamily Alestiinae was promoted to family level (Alestiidae) and the subfamilies Crenuchinae and Characidiinae were moved to the family Crenuchidae.

Other fish families that were formerly classified as members of the Characidae, but which were moved into separate families of their own during recent taxonomic revisions (after 1994) include Acestrorhynchidae, Anostomidae, Chilodontidae, Citharinidae, Ctenoluciidae, Curimatidae, Distichodontidae, Gasteropelecidae, Hemiodontidae, Hepsetidae, Parodontidae, Prochilodontidae, Serrasalmidae, and Triportheidae.

The larger piranhas were originally classified as belonging to the Characidae, but various revisions place them in their own related family, the Serrasalmidae. This reassignment has yet to enjoy universal acceptance, but is gaining in popularity among taxonomists working with these fishes. Given the current state of flux of the Characidae, a number of other changes will doubtless take place, reassigning once-familiar species to other families. Indeed, the entire phylogeny of the Ostariophysi – fishes possessing a Weberian apparatus – has yet to be settled conclusively. Until that phylogeny is settled, the opportunity for yet more upheavals within the taxonomy of the characoid fishes is considerable.

Classification

Phylogeny

Taxonomy
The subfamilies and tribes currently recognized by most if not all authors, and their respective genera, are:
Subfamily Spintherobolus clade
 Amazonspinther
 Spintherobolus
Subfamily Stethaprioninae 

 Tribe Rhoadsiini [Astyanax clade]
 Astyanacinus
 Astyanax
 Carlana
 Ctenobrycon
 Inpaichthys
 Nematobrycon
 Oligosarcus
 Parastremma
 Psellogrammus
 Rhoadsia
 Tribe Stygichthyini [Jupiaba clade]
 Coptobrycon
 Deuterodon
 Erythrocharax
 Jupiaba
 Macropsobrycon
 Myxiops
 Parecbasis
 Probolodus
 Stygichthys
 Tribe Pristellini [Hemigrammus clade; Aphyoditini]
 Aphyodite
 Atopomesus
 Axelrodia
 Brittanichthys
 Bryconella
 Hasemania
 Hemigrammus
 Hyphessobrycon
 Moenkhausia
 Nematocharax
 Paracheirodon
 Parapristella
 Petitella
 Phycocharax
 Pristella 
 Thayeria
 Tribe Stethaprionini
 Brachychalcinus
 Gymnocorymbus
 Orthospinus
 Poptella
 Stethaprion
 Stichonodon
 Tribe Gymnocharacini
 Bario
 Dectobrycon
 Ectrepopterus
 Grundulus
 Gymnocharacinus
 Gymnotichthys
 Hollandichthys
 Pseudochalceus
 Rachoviscus
 Schultzites
 Tribe Scissorini
 Genycharax
 Leptobrycon
 Microschemobrycon
 Mixobrycon
 Oligobrycon
 Oxybrycon
 Scissor
 Serrabrycon
 Thrissobrycon
 Tucanoichthys
 Tyttobrycon

Subfamily Stevardiinae

 Tribe Eretmobryconini
 Eretmobrycon
 Markiana
 Tribe Xenurobryconini
 Iotabrycon
 Ptychocharax
 Scopaeocharax
 Tyttocharax
 Xenurobrycon
 Tribe Argopleura clade
 Argopleura
 Tribe Glandulocaudini
 Glandulocauda
 Lophiobrycon
 Mimagoniates
 Tribe Stevardiini
 Chrysobrycon
 Corynopoma
 Gephyrocharax
 Hysteronotus
 Pseudocorynopoma
 Pterobrycon
 Tribe Hemibryconini
 Acrobrycon
 Hemibrycon [Boehlkea]
 Tribe Creagrutini
 Carlastyanax
 Creagrutus
 Tribe Landonini
 Landonia
 Tribe Phenacobryconini
 Phenacobrycon
 Tribe Trochilocharacini
 Trochilocharax
 Tribe Diapomini
 Attonitus
 Aulixidens
 Bryconacidnus
 Bryconamericus [Hypobrycon]
 Caiapobrycon
 Ceratobranchia
 Cyanogaster
 Diapoma
 Knodus
 Lepidocharax
 Microgenys
 Monotocheirodon
 Othonocheirodus
 Phallobrycon
 Piabarchus
 Piabina
 Planaltina
 Rhinobrycon
 Rhinopetitia

Subfamily Characinae

 Tribe Protocheirodontini
 Protocheirodon
 Tribe Pseudocheirodontini
 Nanocheirodon
 Pseudocheirodon
 Tribe Aphyocharacini
 Aphyocharacidium
 Aphyocharax
 Leptagoniates
 Inpaichthys
 Paragoniates
 Phenagoniates
 Prionobrama
 Xenagoniates
 Tribe Cheirodontini
 Cheirodon
 Heterocheirodon
 Prodontocharax
 Saccoderma
 Tribe Compsurini
 Acinocheirodon
 Compsura
 Ctenocheirodon
 Holoshesthes [Aphyocheirodon; Cheirodontops]
 Kolpotocheirodon
 Odontostilbe
 Serrapinnus
 Tribe Exodontini
 Bryconexodon
 Exodon 
 Roeboexodon
 Tribe Tetragonopterinae
 Tetragonopterus
 Tribe Characini
 Acanthocharax
 Acestrocephalus
 Charax
 Cynopotamus
 Galeocharax
 Phenacogaster
 Priocharax
 Roeboides

Former members
The Chalceidae, Iguanodectidae, Bryconidae and Heterocharacinae are the most recent clades to be removed in order to maintain a monophyletic Characidae.
Subfamily Iguanodectinae moved to Iguanodectidae
 Bryconops
 Iguanodectes
 Piabucus
Subfamily Heterocharacinae moved to Acestrorhynchidae
 Gnathocharax
 Heterocharax
 Hoplocharax
 Lonchogenys
Subfamily Bryconinae moved to Bryconidae
 Brycon
 Chilobrycon
 Henochilus
Subfamily Salmininae moved to Bryconidae
 Salminus
Genera incertae sedis
 Chalceus moved to Chalceidae

Genera incertae sedis
A large number of taxa in this family are incertae sedis. The relationships of many fish in this family – in particular species traditionally placed in the Tetragonopterinae, which had become something of a "wastebin taxon" – are poorly known, a comprehensive phylogenetic study for the entire family is needed. The genera Hyphessobrycon, Astyanax, Hemigrammus, Moenkhausia, and Bryconamericus include the largest number of currently recognized species
among characid fishes that are in need of revision; Astyanax and Hyphessobrycon in the usual delimitation are among the largest genera in this family. These genera were originally proposed between 1854 and 1908 and are still more or less defined as by Carl H. Eigenmann in 1917, though diverse species have been added to each genus since that time. The anatomical diversity within each genus, the fact that each of these generic groups at the present time cannot be well-defined, and the high number of species involved are the major reasons for the lack of phylogenetic analyses dealing with the relationships of the species within these generic "groups".

References

 de Lucena, Carlos Alberto Santos (2003): New characid fish, Hyphessobrycon scutulatus, from the rio Teles Pires drainage, upper rio Tapajós system (Ostariophysi: Characiformes: Characidae). Neotropical Ichthyology 1(2): 93-96. PDF fulltext
 Géry, Jacques (1977): Characoids of the World. 
 Nelson, Joseph S. (2006): Fishes of the World. John Wiley & Sons, Inc. 

 
Extant Miocene first appearances
Ray-finned fish families